Penichroa fasciata is a species of beetles in the family Cerambycidae, the only species in the genus Penichroa.

References

Graciliini
Monotypic Cerambycidae genera